Kashinath Govind Jalmi was born on 13 July 1950, Indian politician from Goa, India. Dotor Jalmi (Dotor means Doctor in Konkani), as he was widely known all over Goa, was just not a legal luminary or a medical practitioner or a firebrand legislator; he was the most respected Dotor by a common Goenkar.

Born to a poor family he had to struggle a lot in order to complete his education. He completed MBBS from Bombay University and was the first doctor from Gaud Maratha Samaj community formerly a part of Gauda and Kunbi community. Being an active member of the Rashtra Seva Dal, Jalmi was strongly influenced by socialist ideology.

Jalmi has also served the state as a minister for health, law, revenue and legislative affairs for a brief period in 1990, when seven Congressmen defected to topple the Congress government. He was the minister in the alternative government of Progressive Democratic Front that lasted for hardly eight months. The three-time MLA of the Maharashtrawadi Gomantak Party (MGP), Jalmi was also the most dynamic leader of the opposition in the Assembly elected in 1994.

Though a medical practitioner, Jalmi was always more interested in legal matters and was considered an encyclopedia of the Constitution of India as well as parliamentary affairs. He was the MGP MLA for three consecutive terms since 1984 and had won with highest number of margin of 7753 votes in 1989 election.

Jalmi has however remained in the history of Parliamentary democracy with his landmark decision in 1990 that speaker cannot be part of defections. He was part of the same government of the PDF in 1990 that had elected defector speaker Dr Luis Proto Barbosa as their chief minister. His decision was later upheld by the Supreme Court of India.

Starting as a grassroot level worker of the MGP, Jalmi had come up from the MGP cadre to become the party's executive member in 1980, central executive member in 1983 and then elected as the MLA in 1984 Assembly election from Kumbarjuve constituency in a 30-member Goa, Daman and Diu Assembly.

He entered active politics as the Sarpanch of Tivrem-Orgao in 1978. He was also the activist of the Gaud Maratha Samaj since 1976. Jalmi was also active in the sports field and was the active member of the Union Sports Club since 1968.

Contrary to his progressive views in the party as well as in the Assembly, Jalmi was caught up in a controversy for the first time when he wholeheartedly supported the controversial Nylon 6,6 project coming up in his Priol constituency, at Keri. In spite of fielding Savoi Verem sarpanch and MGP worker Mohan Verenkar as an independent candidate against him by the anti-Nylon 6,6 movement, Jalmi scraped through with mere margin of 1342 votes.

Jalmi, a democrat otherwise, however was also made the target by the whole Goan media when he supported the clause in the Right to Information Act that tried to suppress the press freedom. He otherwise always remained favourite of the media with his studied views on any issue and raising technical and legal issues to counter the opponents.

References 

http://oheraldo.in/News/Main%20Page%20News/Kashinath-Jalmi-passes-away/62165.html 
http://www.goanews.com/news_disp.php?newsid=2422 
http://articles.timesofindia.indiatimes.com/2012-07-23/goa/32803492_1_leader-cardiac-problems-goa-medical-college

1950 births
2012 deaths
Maharashtrawadi Gomantak Party politicians
People from North Goa district
Goa MLAs 1984–1989
20th-century Indian politicians
Leaders of the Opposition in Goa